Royal Headache was an Australian punk rock and garage band from Sydney. The band was formed in 2008 and was composed of Tim "Shogun" Wall (vocals), Lawrence "Law" Hall (guitar), Joseph "Joe" Sukit (bass), Chris "Shortty" Shortt (drums) and Gabrielle de Giorgio (keyboards, organ, percussion, vocals).

The band released two albums, Royal Headache (2011) and High (2015).

In June 2017, the band announced its dissolution via a post on their Facebook page.

History
Royal Headache was born in 2008 in a boat shed in Putney, a suburb of Sydney, on the banks of the Parramatta River. It was here that Shortty and Law started jamming. "We just wanted to do something more stripped back," said Shortty of the band's beginnings. He also described it as "[a] back-to-basics rock and roll sensibility".

On a trip to Melbourne's Flip Out festival, they handed out copies of their rough instrumental demo hoping to find a singer, which piqued the interest of Shogun who had known Shortty from the Sydney punk and hardcore scene. Royal Headache's first show was in late January 2009, at a warehouse space called Maggotville.

Royal Headache's first single, "Eloise", was released in 2010.

The group's 2011 self-titled debut album was a big word-of-mouth success for an independent Sydney band not backed by a major label subsidiary. In 2012, the band toured the US in support of the album. 

At the AIR Awards of 2012, they were nominated for three awards, winning Best Independent Album.

In 2013, the band split and promptly disappeared, refusing record company offers. The band reformed in 2014, and played a handful of sold out shows.

During a performance at the Sydney Opera House, during the Vivid Sydney Festival in May 2015, the band forced to end a performance early after 60 fans stormed the stage and were dispersed by police and security guards. An Opera House spokesperson said "Towards the end of the Royal Headache performance, some members of the audience made their way up on stage. Security attended and assisted patrons back to their seats. The performance resumed and the band completed their set."

In August 2015, the group released their second studio album High. Vice Magazine said "In just under 30-minutes the record is short but full of joy and hopelessness with touches of sadness." In response to Vice Magazine's review, lead singer Shogun said "To be honest, they are all sad songs. There's no other reason to write a song. A song for me is someone trying to deal with a rift between themselves and reality. Singing a traditional love ballad to a bunch of Sydney punk kids is one of the most hardcore things you could do. Sing a pretty song to an Australian set of heteronormative people. Miss the mark and you're really in deep shit."

In 2016, both Sukit and Shortt quit the band. The band's performances that year, including the Bad Friday festival and a headlining show at the Factory Theatre, saw a new lineup of Shogun, Law and keyboardist Gabrielle De Giorgio, with two session musicians completing the rhythm section.

In June 2017, the band announced its dissolution via a post on their Facebook page, simply saying: "2008-2017". In 2018, Shogun describes the group's twilight as an "emotional holocaust," and he hasn't spoken to a member of Royal Headache in two years. He also said that he does not "talk to anyone from that period anymore." In 2018, he commenced work with a new band called Shogun & The Sheets.

Discography

Studio albums

Extended plays

Singles

As lead artist

Awards and nominations

AIR Awards
The Australian Independent Record Awards (commonly known informally as AIR Awards) is an annual awards night to recognise, promote and celebrate the success of Australia's Independent Music sector.

|-
| rowspan="3" | AIR Awards of 2012
| rowspan="2" | Royal Headache (themselves)
| Best Independent Artist
| 
|-
| Breakthrough Independent Artist
| 
|-
| Royal Headache
| Best Independent Album
| 
|-

Australian Music Prize
The Australian Music Prize (the AMP) is an annual award of $30,000 given to an Australian band or solo artist in recognition of the merit of an album released during the year of award. The commenced in 2005.

|-
| 2015
| High
| Australian Music Prize
| 
|-

EG Awards / Music Victoria Awards
The EG Awards (known as Music Victoria Awards since 2013) are an annual awards night celebrating Victorian music. They commenced in 2006.

|-
| EG Awards of 2011

| Royal Headache
| Best New Talent
| 
|-

References

Australian punk rock groups
Australian garage rock groups
Musical groups from Sydney
Musical groups established in 2008
Musical groups disestablished in 2013
Musical groups reestablished in 2014
Musical groups disestablished in 2017
What's Your Rupture? artists